Shipunovo is a rural locality (a village) in Vorobyovskoye Rural Settlement, Sokolsky District, Vologda Oblast, Russia. The population was 17 as of 2002.

Geography 
Shipunovo is located 62 km northeast of Sokol (the district's administrative centre) by road. Pirogovo is the nearest rural locality.

References 

Rural localities in Sokolsky District, Vologda Oblast